In the Season of Buds is a 1910 silent short film directed by D. W. Griffith and starring Mary Pickford and Mack Sennett. It was produced and distributed by the Biograph Company.

Cast
Mack Sennett – Henry
Mary Pickford – Mabel
Charles H. West – Steve
W. Chrystie Miller – Uncle Zeke
Kate Bruce – Aunt

Preservation status
Paper print is held by the Library of Congress.

References

External links
 In the Season of Buds at IMDb.com

1910 films
American silent short films
Films directed by D. W. Griffith
Biograph Company films
American black-and-white films
Silent American drama films
1910 drama films
1910s American films